Xocia's Dance is the thirteenth studio album by American hard bop tenor saxophonist Harold Land as band leader. The album was initially released in 1981 via Muse Records label and re-released on CD in 1990.

Reception
Stephen Cook of Allmusic wrote "Maybe best known for his 1959 Contemporary album The Fox, tenor saxophonist Harold Land spent the '50s and '60s rebuking the stereotype of the West Coast sound being all wafer-thin with his robust and intense work as both a solo artist and sideman. And while he slowed down a bit in the '70s, Land came roaring back with this exceptional effort from 1981. Both the playing and the songs are all top notch. To help out, Land enlists the fine talents of drummer Billy Higgins, vibraphonist Bobby Hutcherson, pianist George Cables, trumpeter Oscar Brashear, and bassist John Heard. Highly recommended."

Track listing

Personnel
Harold Land – saxophone
Oscar Brashear – trumpet
George Cables – piano
Billy Higgins – drums
Bobby Hutcherson – vibes (tracks 2 4 5)
John Heard – bass
Ray Armando – percussion

References

Muse Records albums
Harold Land albums
1981 albums